The Chain Bridge Road School is an historic school, located at 2820 Chain Bridge Road, Northwest, Washington, D.C., in the Palisades neighborhood.

History
It was built in 1923 to a Colonial Revival design by Municipal Architect Albert L. Harris.  It replaced a one room schoolhouse from 1865. The school served African American public school students from the neighborhood around Battery Kemble.

See also
 National Register of Historic Places listings in the District of Columbia

References

School buildings completed in 1923
School buildings on the National Register of Historic Places in Washington, D.C.
The Palisades (Washington, D.C.)